"Universo" is a song by Spanish singer Blas Cantó. The song would have represented Spain in the Eurovision Song Contest 2020 at Rotterdam, The Netherlands. The song was written by Cantó, Dan Hammond, Ashley Hicklin, Dangelo Ortega and Mikolaj Trybulec, and produced by Hammond and Trybulec; the latter also co-wrote and produced the 2019 Czech Eurovision entry "Friend of a Friend".

Eurovision Song Contest

The song would have represented Spain in the Eurovision Song Contest 2020, after Blas Cantó was internally selected by the Spanish broadcaster TVE on 5 October 2019. As Spain is a member of the "Big Five", the song automatically advanced to the final, which would have been held on 16 May 2020 in Rotterdam, Netherlands.

Music video
The official video of the song, directed by Cristian Velasco, was filmed in Tenerife and Lanzarote in the Canary Islands, and was released on 30 January 2020.

Track listing

References

2020 songs
Eurovision songs of 2020
Eurovision songs of Spain
Songs written by Ashley Hicklin
Blas Cantó songs